Koenigia weyrichii (synonym Persicaria weyrichii), the Chinese knotweed or Weyrich's knotweed, is a large, perennial, rhizomatous herb native to East Asia.

It is one of the parents of the cultivated hybrid Koenigia × fennica, the other being Koenigia alpina.

References

 Online Atlas of the British & Irish Flora entry

Polygonoideae